Razab Rural District is a rural district (dehestan) in the Central District of Sarvabad County, Kurdistan Province, Iran. At the 2006 census, its population was 7,243, in 1,747 families. The rural district has 13 villages.

References 

Rural Districts of Kurdistan Province
Sarvabad County